Agar Rodney Adamson (November 8, 1901 – April 8, 1954) was a Canadian politician. He was a Progressive Conservative member of the House of Commons of Canada who represented the riding of York West from 1940-1954. He died in a plane crash in 1954.

Biography
Adamson was born in Toronto, Ontario, in 1901. He was the son of Agar Adamson, who commanded Princess Patricia's Canadian Light Infantry from 1916 to 1918 during World War I. His mother was Mabel Cawthra, a wealthy heiress, artist and decorator. He attended Ridley College in St. Cantharines and later Magdalene College in Cambridge, England. At the age of 17, he enlisted in the Royal Air Force and served as a pilot in 1918 in the last year of World War I. He was trained as a mining engineer and worked for Brazilian Traction in South America and Ontario Hydro.

He was elected as a Conservative to represent York West, a riding to the west of Toronto that would eventually become Mississauga. Shortly after he was elected he took leave from parliament to serve overseas in the army with the Lorne Scots regiment. He served with the regiment for two years as an intelligence officer. In 1942 he transferred to a headquarters unit in London, England where he served for the rest of the war. In 1947 he married Cynthia Jacqueline Oakley whom he had met in Banff on a skiing trip. Previously he had been married to Rosamund Lazier but that marriage ended in divorce. He and Cynthia raised two sons.

After the war, he returned to his role as M.P. He was re-elected in 1945, 1949 and 1953. He and his wife died in a TCA plane crash near Moose Jaw SK on April 8, 1954. He was 52.

References

External links

Cawthra family
1901 births
1952 deaths
Canadian Army officers of World War II
Canadian mining engineers
Conservative Party of Canada (1867–1942) MPs
Members of the House of Commons of Canada from Ontario
Politicians from Toronto
Progressive Conservative Party of Canada MPs
Royal Air Force personnel of World War I
Lorne Scots (Peel, Dufferin and Halton Regiment)
Military personnel from Toronto